Amanda Cohen is the chef and owner of Dirt Candy restaurant in New York City. Although she specializes in vegetarian cuisine, she herself is not a vegetarian (although she used to be).

Biography 
She graduated from the Natural Gourmet Cookery School and went on to work at (among other restaurants) Angelica's Kitchen, Bobby Flay’s Mesa Grill, and Blanche’s Organic Café. In 2008, she opened Dirt Candy.

In 2012, she published the Dirt Candy Cookbook.

In 2018, she was profiled in Maya Gallus's documentary film The Heat: A Kitchen (R)evolution.

Competition 
In 2010, she competed against Masaharu Morimoto on Iron Chef America in "Battle Vegetable" and lost. Since 2018, she has been featured as one of the Iron Chefs on Iron Chef Canada.

Personal life 
Cohen is married to writer Grady Hendrix, a coauthor of her cookbook Dirt Candy, A Cookbook: Flavor-Forward Food From the Upstart New York City Vegetarian Restaurant.

TV appearances 
 2018 – present: Today
 2018 – present: Iron Chef Canada
 2018: Top Chef Canada
 2015: CBS This Morning
 2010: Iron Chef America

References

External links 
 

Canadian television chefs
Businesspeople from Ottawa
Living people
Canadian cookbook writers
Participants in Canadian reality television series
Canadian restaurateurs
Women restaurateurs
Writers from Ottawa
Year of birth missing (living people)
Canadian women chefs